Souris West is a municipality that holds community status in Prince Edward Island, Canada. It was incorporated in 1972. Contains the Locality of Souris West and part of the Locality of Lower Rollo Bay.

Demographics 

See also 
List of communities in Prince Edward Island

References 

Communities in Kings County, Prince Edward Island
Rural municipalities in Prince Edward Island